Monroe County is a county located in the U.S. state of Illinois. According to the 2020 census, it had a population of 34,962. Its county seat and largest city is Waterloo.

Monroe County is included in the St. Louis, MO-IL Metropolitan Statistical Area. It is located in the southern portion of Illinois known historically as "Little Egypt".

History
Indigenous peoples lived along the Mississippi River and related waterways for thousands of years before European contact. French Jesuit priests in the Illinois Country encountered the Kaskaskia and Cahokia, bands of the Illiniwek confederacy.

The first European settlement in this area was St. Philippe, founded in 1723 by Philippe François Renault, a French courtier, on his concession about three miles north of Fort de Chartres along the Mississippi River. This early agricultural community quickly produced a surplus, and grains were sold to the lower Louisiana colony for years. They were integral to that community's survival, as its climate did not allow cultivation of such staple grains.

Monroe County was formed in 1816 out of Randolph and St. Clair counties, as the 8th county created from the then Illinois Territory.
Beginning on the Mississippi River where the base line, which is about three-fourths of a mile below Judge Briggs's present residence, strikes the said river; thence with the base line until it strikes the first township line therefrom; thence southeast to the southeast corner of township two south, range nine west; thence south to the southeast corner of township four north, range nine west; thence southwestwardly to the Mississippi, so as to include Alexander McNabb's farm, and thence up the Mississippi to the beginning shall constitute a separate county, to be called MONROE.
Illinois Territorial Laws 1815-16, p. 25

It was named in honor of James Monroe, who had just served as United States Secretary of War and who was elected President later that same year. Its first county seat was Harrisonville, named for William Henry Harrison, former governor of the Northwest Territory and future President. Harrison invested in several tracts of land in the American Bottoms above Harrisonville, mostly in the present precinct of Moredock, ownership of which he retained until his death.

Waterloo was designated as the mantle of county seat in 1825. The sites of the colonial towns of St. Philippe and Harrisonville were submerged by the Mississippi River, in flooding caused by deforestation of river banks during the steamboat years. Crews cut so many trees that banks destabilized and collapsed in the current, making the river wider and more shallow from St. Louis to the confluence with the Ohio River.  This change caused more severe flooding, as well as lateral channel changes, such as the one that cut off the village of Kaskaskia from the Illinois mainland.

An unincorporated community of Harrisonville was re-established east of the original site. The bounds of Monroe County in 1816 did not include Precincts 1 and 6 (village of Hecker and Prairie du Long), Precinct 1 and most of 6 was added in 1825 from St. Clair County. The strip of Precinct 6 from the survey township line east to the Kaskaskia was added, once again from St. Clair, two years later in 1827. Some minor adjustments and clarifications of the boundaries have taken place, but the borders have remained essentially static since 1827.

Geography

The western part of the county on the Mississippi River is part of the American Bottom floodplain, while the eastern portion of the county is relatively flat and was originally prairie.  The transition zone between has high bluffs of limestone and dolomite and has distinctive Karst topography with numerous sinkholes, caves, and springs.

Climate and weather

Major highways
  Interstate 255
  U.S. Highway 50
  Illinois Route 3
  Illinois Route 156
  Illinois Route 159
  Illinois Route 158

Adjacent counties
 St. Clair County - northeast
 Randolph County - southeast
 Ste. Genevieve County, Missouri - south
 Jefferson County, Missouri - west
 St. Louis County, Missouri - northwest

Demographics

As of the 2010 United States Census, there were 32,957 people, 12,589 households, and 9,375 families residing in the county. The racial makeup of the county was 98.0% white, 0.4% Asian, 0.2% American Indian, 0.2% black or African American, 0.3% from other races, and 0.8% from two or more races. Those of Hispanic or Latino origin made up 1.4% of the population. In terms of ancestry, 53.9% were German, 16.5% were Irish, 9.6% were English, and 6.2% were American.

Of the 12,589 households, 34.7% had children under the age of 18 living with them, 62.9% were married couples living together, 7.9% had a female householder with no husband present, 25.5% were non-families, and 21.5% of all households were made up of individuals. The average household size was 2.59 and the average family size was 3.02. The median age was 41.0 years.

The median income for a household in the county was $68,253 and the median income for a family was $80,832. Males had a median income of $55,988 versus $39,375 for females. The per capita income for the county was $31,091. About 3.5% of families and 4.5% of the population were below the poverty line, including 4.3% of those under age 18 and 2.4% of those age 65 or over.

Transportation

Highways
 Interstate 255 Overlaps U.S. Highway 50 From Jefferson Barracks Bridge and Missouri east to Route 3 north of Columbia, then north toward Dupo
Provides access to the Interstate System, South Saint Louis County via the J.B. bridge as well as Downtown St. Louis and western St. Clair County
 U.S. Highway 50 Overlaps Interstate 255 From Jefferson Barracks Bridge and Missouri east to Route 3 north of Columbia, then north toward Dupo
Provides access to the Interstate System, South Saint Louis County via the J.B. bridge as well as Downtown St. Louis and western St. Clair County
 Illinois Route 3 From Interstate 255 and Dupo south southeast through Columbia and Waterloo on turning east toward Red Bud
Main north-south corridor and the backbone of Monroe County
 Illinois Route 156 From western terminus at Valmeyer east through Waterloo to Hecker and on to the eastern terminus at Illinois Route 13 west of New Athens and south of Freeburg
Briefly overlaps Illinois Route 159 in and just north of Hecker
Also called the Valmeyer highway or Hecker highway, west and east of Waterloo, respectively, it runs from the bluffs of the Mississippi to the Kaskaskia
 Illinois Route 158 From western terminus south of Columbia at Route 3, east northeast toward Millstadt
The area's main link with central and eastern St. Clair County for those not near Hecker
 Illinois Route 159 From southern terminus in Red Bud at Route 3 and Route 154, north through Prairie du Long to Hecker and on toward Smithton
Briefly overlaps Illinois Route 156 in and just north of Hecker
Significant eastern north-south corridor, provides alternate routes, and primary north-south link for Prairie Du Long and Hecker

County roads
 Bluff Road
runs along the bluffs from Palmer Rd. northwest of Columbia, through old Valmeyer and Chalfin Bridge, past Fults to Prairie du Rocher in Randolph County
 Maeystown Road
runs from Illinois Route 3 in Waterloo (as Lakeview Drive) through Wartburg and Maeystown to Bluff Rd. at Chalfin Bridge
 Kaskaskia Road
historic route from Kaskaskia to St. Louis, leaves Illinois Route 3 south of Waterloo, passes through Burksville and St. Joe, descends into the Bottoms outside Renault, crosses Bluff Rd. and railroad tracks to Stringtown Rd.
 Hanover Road
Runs from Route 3 west, past New Hanover down the Fountain Gap to Bluff Rd. at Miles Rd. and B Rd.. Marks approximate future border between Columbia and Waterloo.
 Gall Road
Northern terminus at Rt. 3/Main St. four-way in Columbia, south across Hanover Rd., and southern terminus at HH Rd. northwest of Waterloo and near Annbriar Golf Course.
 HH Road
Runs from Gilmore Lakes Rd., north of Floraville Rd., west across Route 3 in Waterloo (as Country Club Ln.)  to Bluff Rd. east of Fountain
 KK Road
Runs from the Mississippi River levee opposite Crystal City, Missouri, west across Bluff Rd. up the bluffs at Monroe City, through Madonnaville, across Maeystown Rd., through Burksville and Burksville Station, across Route 3 to J Rd. south of Route 156
 LL Road
With a western terminus at Franklin St. in Maeystown, it travels east across Kaskaskia Rd., through Tipton, across Route 3, temporarily overlaps with J Rd. for about 0.5 miles east of Rt. 3 and west of Rt. 159, crosses Rt. 159 south of Hecker and north of Red Bud, ends with eastern terminus at Beck Rd. just west of the Kaskaskia River and near the Nike Missile Site.

Public Transportation
There is a regular MetroBus express bus, 502X Waterloo-Columbia, running from Waterloo, through Columbia, to the MetroLink station in East St. Louis.

Rivers

 Mississippi River

Bridges and ferries
Jefferson Barracks Bridge - crosses the Mississippi northwest of Columbia, carries Interstate 255
Access
none
 Kaskaskia River
Bridges and ferries
none
Access
none

The closest access to and bridges over the Kaskaskia are downriver at Baldwin in Randolph County via Route 154 and upriver at New Athens in St. Clair County via Route 13. South of Monroe County, there is a ferry across the Mississippi in Randolph County, providing access to Ste. Genevieve, Missouri and Pere Marquette State Park, and a bridge at Chester via Route 150.

Rail

While the railroad played a large part in the history and development of the county, the main line through the county, running along Illinois Route 3, has been abandoned and removed. However, Union Pacific tracks run through the Bottoms from the intermodal yard at Dupo in St. Clair County, running roughly parallel to Bluff Rd. which crosses them several times, through old Valmeyer and Fults on past Prairie du Rocher in Randolph County. The tracks are still in use, but carry only freight, and have no stops in Monroe County.

Aviation
There is a small airfield in the Bottoms west of Columbia called Sackman Field.

Communities

Cities
 Columbia
 Waterloo

Villages
 Fults
 Hecker
 Maeystown
 Valmeyer

Unincorporated Communities

 Ames
 Burksville
 Burksville Station
 Chalfin Bridge
 Foster Pond
 Fountain
 Harrisonville
 Madonnaville
 Merrimac
 Monroe City
 New Hanover
 Renault
 St. Joe
 Tipton
 Wartburg

Former Settlement

 St. Philippe

Precincts 
For census and election purposes, Monroe County is currently divided into 26 numbered precincts (1-27, for some reason there is no Precinct 14). However, for geographical, genealogical, and historic purposes the older, named precincts are of greater utility.
 Bluff Precinct
named for the ubiquitous limestone cliffs it sits atop and which run along its western bounds.
 Columbia Precinct
formerly Eagle Precinct from the original French name for their settlement, L'Aigle
 Harrisonville Precinct
honors William Henry Harrison who also gave his name to a settlement
 Mitchie Precinct
so named for the Mitchegamie Indians who at one time inhabited the extreme southern part of the county
 Moredock Precinct
after John Moredock, territorial legislator, and Major commanding a battalion in the War of 1812
 New Design Precinct
named after the settlement began by James Lemen, a confidante of Thomas Jefferson, in 1786
 New Hanover Precinct
as with the settlement, its name recalls Hanover, Germany, hometown of the settlement's founder
 Prairie Du Long Precinct
from hybrid French/English "Long Prairie", it was added in 1825, after the county's genesis, the strip along the river in 1827.
 Renault Precinct
also a settlement, for Philip Francois Renault of the French Company of the Indies, an early exploiter of the area
 Waterloo Precinct
formerly Fountain Precinct, from Fountain Creek which runs through it on its way to the bluffs and down to the river

Government
Monroe County, along with neighboring Randolph County, is located within Regional Office of Education #45.

Politics

Monroe County was hostile to the “Yankee” Civil War and voted solidly Democratic until Theodore Roosevelt carried the county in 1904. Since that time, however, the county has become predominately Republican, and the only Democrats to gain a majority since 1904 have been Catholic Al Smith in 1928, Franklin D. Roosevelt in 1932 and 1936, and Lyndon Johnson in 1964. Since 1968, Monroe County has been carried by the Republican Presidential nominee in every election except when Bill Clinton won a narrow plurality in 1992.

See also
 Fountain Creek Bridge
 Illinois Caverns State Natural Area
 Kaskaskia River State Fish and Wildlife Area
 National Register of Historic Places listings in Monroe County

References

External links
 
 IRAD Monroe County Fact Sheet
 Monroe County Web Directory
 Monroe County Infobahn

 
Illinois counties
1816 establishments in Illinois Territory
Illinois counties on the Mississippi River
Southern Illinois
Metro East
Populated places established in 1816
Pre-statehood history of Illinois